Phacocerus piceus is a species of beetle in the family Carabidae, the only species in the genus Phacocerus.

References

Lebiinae